NIMR Automotive LLC is a military vehicle manufacturer in the United Arab Emirates that produces an armoured personnel carrier series named Nimr. In 2014, it merged into Emirates Defence Industries Company.

History 

In 2011, construction began on a new factory within the Tawazun Industrial Park in Abu Dhabi, including facilities for research and development, production, and marketing of the NIMR. A secondary metal fabrication plant was set up in Al Ain, UAE. NIMR's Production Facility is located on an area of 37,500 Sq/m in Abu Dhabi, in the United Arab Emirates.

In July 2012 it was disclosed that Algeria and the United Arab Emirates signed an agreement to jointly produce NIMR armoured vehicles in Algeria. Under the CKD, these agreements between the Algerian Ministry of Defence's Mechanical Industry Promotion Group and Tawazun Holdings of the UAE, the NIMR-Algerie Joint Stock Company was established to produce 4x4 armoured station wagon variants.

In June 2014 NIMR Automotive held a ground-breaking ceremony for its new integrated facility for production of NIMR vehicles at the Tawazun Industrial Park in Abu Dhabi. The facility, which will have a built-up area of 37,500 square meters in addition to a test track and service center, was scheduled to be fully operational by December 2015.

In December 2014, the United Arab Emirates (UAE) government announced the creation of a national state-controlled defence group (Emirates Defence Industries Company (EDIC) through the merger of some military organisations in the Mubalada Development Company, Tawazun Holdings, and Emirates Advanced Investments Group (EAIG).

NIMR Automotive LLC is a defence vehicle manufacturer. NIMR is a member of the Abu Dhabi Government owned Emirates Defence Industries Company (EDIC).
NIMR produces wheeled military vehicles which are designed, manufactured and assembled entirely in the UAE. NIMR's range of 4x4 and 6x6 vehicles are available in armoured or non-armoured configurations, with modular configurable crew capacity and payload.

Products

AJBAN 
The AJBAN Class of 4x4 vehicles provides a multipurpose platform for military requirements at 9,000 kg capacity from utility vehicles to fully protected patrol vehicles. A universal 4x4 chassis is utilised. All vehicles in the AJBAN Class can be protected, and specific protected models are included for crew survivability with fully tested and certified cabins.

Variants 
 AJBAN 420
 AJBAN 440
 AJBAN 440A (To be equipped with anti-tank guided missiles)
 AJBAN 450
 AJBAN ISV Internal Security Vehicle
 AJBAN LRSOV Special Operations Vehicle (SOV)
 AJBAN VIP

HAFEET 
The HAFEET Class of 6x6 vehicles provides a multipurpose platform for military requirements at 13,000 kg capacity from utility vehicles to fully protected patrol vehicles. A universal 6x6 chassis is utilised for a common logistic basis. All vehicles in the HAFEET Class can be protected, and specific protected models are included for crew survivability with fully tested and certified cabins.

Variants 
 HAFEET Class:
 HAFEET 620
 HAFEET 620A Logistics and Utility Vehicle
 HAFEET 640A Artillery Support Vehicle (Observation and Command & Control configurations)
 HAFEET APC
 HAFEET Ambulance

Jais 
The Jais Infantry Fighting Vehicle was formerly known as the N35

Variants 

 Jais Class:
 Jais 4x4
 Jais 6x6

RIV 
The RIV is a light 4x4 Rapid Intervention Vehicle on offer to Special Forces.

Variants 
 RIV Class:

References 

manufacturing companies based in Abu Dhabi
Nimr (vehicle manufacturer)